London Waterloo station is a central London terminus on the National Rail network in the UK.

Waterloo station may also refer to:

Railway stations

United Kingdom
Aberdeen Waterloo railway station, a former station in Aberdeen, Scotland
Waterloo Halt railway station, a former station in Rudry, Caerphilly, Wales
Waterloo (Hanover Stadtbahn station), in Lower Saxony, Germany
Waterloo International railway station, a former Eurostar terminal in London, England  
Waterloo railway station (Merseyside), in England
Waterloo tube station, a London Underground station below the mainline station

Elsewhere
Waterloo metro station (Charleroi), a light rail station in Hainaut, Belgium
Waterloo railway station, Belgium, in Walloon Brabant, Belgium
Waterloo railway station, Lower Hutt, in Greater Wellington, New Zealand
Waterloo railway station, Sydney, a rapid transit station in New South Wales, Australia
Waterloo station (Indiana), in the United States
Yau Ma Tei station, a rapid transit station, formerly named Waterloo station, in Kowloon, Hong Kong

Similar names
University of Waterloo station, a light rail station in Ontario, Canada
Waterloo East railway station, in London, England
Waterloo Road (NSR) railway station, in Staffordshire, England
Waterlooplein metro station, in Amsterdam, Netherlands

Other uses
Waterloo Station (TV series), an Australian television series

See also

Waterloo (disambiguation)
Waterloo & City line, a London Underground shuttle line between Waterloo and Bank
Waterloo Underground Depot
Waterloo and Whitehall Railway